The Hits of Hank Snow is a compilation album by the Canadian country singer Hank Snow, released in 1978 on the RCA Victor label in the UK.

Track listing
"North to Chicago" (Les Pouliot) – 1971
"Hijack" (Jack Cloe) - 1974
"Come the Morning" (Dick Feller) - 1970
"That's You and Me" (Gene Martin, Chuck Glaser) - 1974
"Merry-Go-Round of Love" (Robert Lee Floyd) - 1974
"Easy to Love" (Dave Burgess) - 1974
"I Just Wanted to Know (How the Wind Was Blowing)" (Cindy Walker) - 1967
"The Name of the Game Was Love" (Cy Coben) - 1968
"The Late and Great Love (Of My Heart)" (Cindy Walker) - 1967
"Colorado Country Morning" (John C. Cunningham, Robert Duncan) - 1974
"Vanishing Breed" (Bill Eldridge, Gary Stewart) - 1970
"Rome Wasn't Built in a Day" (Yvonne Devaney) - 1968
"Hello Love" (Betty Jean Robinson, Aileen Mnich) - 1973
"Who Will Answer? (Aleluya No. 1)" (Sheila Davis, Luis Eduardo Aute) - 1967

American Billboard charts

Production
Arranged by Cam Mullins (tracks 7 & 9)
Liner notes by Bob Powell, presenter London Country and BBC Radio London
Producers Chet Atkins and Ronny Light

References

1978 compilation albums
Hank Snow albums
albums produced  by Chet Atkins
RCA Victor compilation albums